Petäjä is a Finnish surname. Notable people with the surname include:

Tuuli Petäjä-Sirén (born 1983), Finnish windsurfer 
Erkka Petäjä (born 1964), Finnish footballer 

Finnish-language surnames